Homosexuality: Disease or Way of Life? is a 1956 book by the psychoanalyst Edmund Bergler, in which the author argues that homosexuality is a curable illness. Bergler denies that homosexuality is caused by hormonal or other biological factors, the Oedipus complex, or having a dominant mother and a weak or absent father, instead attributing both male and female homosexuality to pre-Oedipal factors involving an unsolved masochistic conflict with the mother during the earliest period of infancy. According to Bergler, homosexuality in men reflects unconscious fear and hatred of women. Bergler argues that there are several different types of homosexuality, each with a distinct clinical profile. Bergler rejects the existence of bisexuality, maintaining that all supposed bisexuals are homosexuals, and criticizes the work of sex researcher Alfred Kinsey. He characterizes homosexual men as sexually promiscuous, and argues that this promiscuity is a result of their unsatisfying sex lives and masochistic craving for danger. Bergler argues against immediately repealing laws against homosexuality, though he suggests that such laws could perhaps be repealed in the future if other measures against homosexuality proved effective. Bergler proposes the publicizing of his ideas as a measure against homosexuality.

Unlike previous works by authors who had argued that homosexuality is a disease, the book provoked denunciation. It was criticized in gay publications such as the Mattachine Review and The Ladder, and its hostile reception was partly due to awareness that it could be used by opponents of gay rights. Bergler's critics argued that he had based his conclusions on an unrepresentative sample of homosexuals. The criticism influenced the reception of later works such as Bieber and colleagues's Homosexuality: A Psychoanalytic Study of Male Homosexuals (1962). The book has also been criticized for the excessive and intemperate language Bergler used in discussing homosexuality. Bergler's views about homosexuality have been compared to those of analysts such as Melanie Klein, Irving Bieber, and Charles W. Socarides, and he has been seen as expressing the psychoanalytic consensus about gay people current in the 1950s.

Summary
Bergler argues that the "problem of homosexuality" has become more important because of four factors: the increasing public awareness of homosexuality, the increasing prevalence of homosexuality due to "the dissemination of misleading statistics", the marriage of "so-called" bisexual men to women, and the discovery that "homosexuality is a curable illness." Bergler criticizes the biologist Alfred Kinsey's research on sex, writing that Kinsey exaggerated the number of homosexuals, and that homosexuals have used Kinsey's statistics to argue in defense of homosexuality. Bergler maintains that homosexuality is "a neurotic distortion of the total personality", involving an "unconscious wish to suffer". He supports his claims about the personality of homosexuals with transcripts of interviews with his homosexual patients and prospective patients. He dismisses the idea that homosexuals would be as happy as heterosexuals if society tolerated homosexuality, as well as the idea that homosexuality has biological or hormonal causes.

The "popular definition" of a male homosexual is understood by Bergler to be "a person who derives his sexual excitement and satisfaction from a person of his own sex in contradistinction to a heterosexual, who is sexually attracted only to members of the opposite sex." Bergler rejects this definition, which also separates exclusive homosexuals from bisexuals, as incorrect, maintaining that it wrongly "accepts the parity between homosexuals and heterosexuals as a matter of fact", "ignores the fact that homosexuality is a neurotic disease", "neglects the fact that specific neurotic defenses and personality traits that are partly or entirely psychopathic and specifically and exclusively characteristic of homosexuals, and that these defenses and traits put the homosexual into a special psychiatric category." Bergler maintains that heterosexuals, unlike homosexuals, have diverse clinical profiles, ranging from normality to any of a variety of different neurotic conditions. He relates homosexual men's "psychic masochism" to the oral stage of development.

Bergler denies that homosexuality is caused by the Oedipus complex, or having a dominant mother and a weak or absent father. Bergler considers the "negative Oedipus complex", a variant of the Oedipus complex in which a boy rejects his father but also admires for his perceived strength and power, and identifies with his mother, one of the great discoveries of Sigmund Freud, the founder of psychoanalysis, but sees it as having no importance in the psychology of homosexuals. He criticizes the analyst Sándor Ferenczi for maintaining otherwise. In Bergler's view, male and female homosexuality have pre-Oedipal origins, beginning in "an unsolved masochistic conflict with the mother of earliest infancy", to which the behavior of parents is largely irrelevant. Homosexuality is an unconscious response to the difficulty children experience in reconciling their objective dependence on their mothers with their subjective feeling of omnipotence, derived from the experience of life in the womb, where they felt entirely self-sufficient. While most children resolve this conflict, which inevitably ends in a recognition of dependence on the mother, without experiencing permanent psychological damage, those who become homosexual do not, perhaps because of their greater inherited megalomania. They begin to hate themselves because of their physical inability to express their aggression, and their attempts to cope with the resulting pain lead to psychic masochism. When they later become physically able to express aggression, they continue to experience frustration because of the punishment they receive, which causes guilt and further reinforces the psychic masochism.

In Bergler's view, homosexuals differ from heterosexual neurotics because of their greater infantile fears "centered on the mother image" and their more extensive "masochistic elaboration". Bergler maintains that boys who become homosexuals try to make themselves independent of their mothers by unconsciously viewing their penises as equivalent to their mothers' breasts, based on the similarity in shape between the two organs and the fact that they both produce a fluid. Uncertain of his ability to duplicate the mother's breast, the boy in later life searches for a further duplication in the form of other men's penises, in which he recognizes his own penis. Bergler argues that this accounts for homosexual men's focus on the penises of their sexual partners and disregard for the rest of their bodies, as well as the narcissism of homosexual men, and their tendency to remember histories of feminine identification, expressed in behavior such as playing with dolls and wearing girls' clothes.

Bergler maintains that homosexual men unconsciously fear and hate women, and that their sexual attraction to men is due only to these negative attitudes toward women. He writes that homosexual men are typically sexually promiscuous and have contempt for their male sexual partners. Bergler argues that while homosexual men attribute their sexual promiscuity to their desire for variety and their "insatiable sexual appetites", its actual causes are the inherently unsatisfying nature of male homosexual sex and homosexual men's "constant masochistic craving for danger". Bergler writes that homosexual men typically have a tendency toward megalomania.

According to Bergler, there are several different types of homosexuality. He identifies twelve types that he refers to as puberal homosexuality, active and passive roles in full-fledged perversion, homosexuality as an unconscious search for a duplicate of oneself as a boy, homosexuality of the positive magic gesture type, homosexuality of the negative magic gesture type, homosexuality of the protective type, homosexuality of the seeking the older protector type, homosexuality combined with other types of perversions, the bisexual, homosexuality of the criminal institution type, and homosexuality in fantasy. Bergler describes puberal homosexuality as harmless, and denies that it is "indicative of future homosexuality", criticizing Kinsey for including prepuberbal and early puberal sex play among boys in his estimates of homosexual activity among males. Bergler writes that while a relationship between "active" and "passive" homosexuals may appear to be an imitation of the "husband-wife relationship", it actually reenacts the relationship between a mother and her baby. He considers homosexuals who unconsciously search for duplicates of themselves as a boys to be dangerous because of their sexual interest in minors. Homosexuality of the positive magic gesture type involves a conflict between the unconscious ego and the inner conscience, which is expressed by performing a "good dead" toward a person such as a stranger, while that of the negative magic gesture type involves actions intended to show how the homosexual does not want to be treated.

Homosexuality of the protective type involves a motive that Bergler describes as an attempt to show that "father loves his little boy". Homosexuality of the seeking the older protector type is found in homosexual men who search for partners who resemble good fathers who can love them, but unconsciously want to be mistreated by a "bad mother". Homosexuality combined with other types of perversions may involve sado-masochism, exhibitionism, transvestism, urolagnia, or scatology. Bergler maintains that all supposed bisexuals are homosexuals, that bisexuality is a fraud perpetrated by homosexuals, and that efforts by homosexual men to have sex with women involve only "lustless mechanical sex". Homosexuality of the criminal institution type shows the similar psychological bases of homosexuality and criminal behavior. Homosexuality in fantasy involves masturbation with homosexual fantasies rather than sexual behavior with another person. Bergler considers all of these types to be based on an attempt to cope with unconscious masochism.

Bergler discusses and criticizes writers such as Oscar Wilde, Herman Melville, Stendhal, Marcel Proust, and Somerset Maugham. He denies that homosexuals have special artistic gifts. Bergler argues that laws against homosexuality should not be repealed at present, though he allows that it might be appropriate to repeal them in the future if other measures against homosexuality proved effective. Bergler proposes the publicizing of three of his conclusions as a measure against homosexuality: that homosexuality is a disease and that there is nothing glamorous about it, that it can be cured, and that it is a disorder associated with "severe unconscious self-damage".

Publication history
First published in 1956 by Hill & Wang, the book went through numerous different editions. A seventh edition was published in 1971.

Reception

Media commentary
Homosexuality: Disease or Way of Life? received a positive review in Time, which endorsed Bergler's views and praised him for discrediting "popular misconceptions" such as that "homosexuality is an incurable, hereditary condition" and therefore normal for some people. However, the book was greeted with an "outpouring of denunciatory rage" from gay rights activists, according to Ronald Bayer. Bayer contrasts this response to that accorded to previous works by authors who had argued that homosexuality is a disease, writing that the outrage represented "a shifting tone in the discussion of psychiatry within the homophile movement", and was partly due to awareness that the book could be used by opponents of gay rights. The gay periodicals such as Mattachine Review and The Ladder published articles critiquing the book. It was discussed in the Mattachine Review by authors such as Sam Morford, the journalist Gilbert Cant, Peter Jackson, Robert Phillips, Luthor Allen, and Richard Mayer, and was reviewed in The Ladder by Carol Hales.

Hales argued that Bergler was "anti-homosexual" and refused to recognize a distinction between stable and unstable homosexuals. She questioned whether he believed his own claims, and suggested that he might have studied "only emotionally immature and mentally disturbed homosexuals." She considered it regrettable that Homosexuality: Disease or Way of Life? had been published at a time when gay people were beginning to gain greater acceptance, because it could be used by "bigots and the prejudiced", but concluded that it could not "delay the march to progress." She urged gay readers of the book to consider it a challenge and refute his claims. According to Bayer, Morford argued that because Bergler had simply defined homosexuality as a disease, he was not writing as a scientist, and that rather than being objective, Bergler's work was motivated by "maniacal moralism". Morford referred to Bergler as a pompous neo-Freudian. Cant's review was the subject of several letters to the Mattachine Review, and Cant responded to these letters.

According to Bayer, Phillips argued that Bergler had "drawn his conclusions from an unrepresentative sample of homosexuals", while the authors of letters to the Mattachine Review compared Bergler's approach to a sociological study of "mankind" based upon a population drawn from San Quentin State Prison and argued that Bergler ignored homosexuals who were free of obsessive conflicts and led happy and contented lives. Bayer, summarizing the criticism directed against Bergler, writes that though some reviewers distinguished Bergler from more responsible psychiatrists, others perceived him as representative of the psychiatric profession. He suggests that the critics who charged in gay publications that Bergler had based his conclusions on an unrepresentative sample of homosexuals had been influenced by the work of the psychologist Evelyn Hooker.

The novelist Richard Hall discussed Homosexuality: Disease or Way of Life? in ONE, comparing Bergler's views about homosexuals to antisemitic and racist prejudice. Hall suggested that "homosexuality in some cases is a disease, and in other cases is a way of life—depending entirely on the feelings a homosexual has about himself."

Responses from psychoanalysts and psychiatrists
The psychoanalyst Irving Bieber and his colleagues noted that Bergler's view that the oral phase is the most determining factor in the development of homosexuality was also held by the analyst Melanie Klein. Bayer observed that Homosexuality: A Psychoanalytic Study of Male Homosexuals (1962) received a negative response from the gay movement that "followed a pattern" set by the earlier critiques of works such as Homosexuality: Disease or Way of Life? The psychiatrist Daniel Cappon described Bergler's division of homosexuality into different types as "anecdotal and dynamic". He added that Bergler's proposed types are "partly descriptive and partly interpretative" and that his typology is "probably grossly incomplete." He criticized Bergler's approach to classification on the grounds that, "There seems to be no logical scheme for deriving an argument or a design of homosexual configurations from the life history of individuals." The psychoanalyst Charles W. Socarides endorsed Bergler's conclusion that homosexuality has a masochistic basis, as well as his views on topics such as female homosexuality. He noted that Bergler was only one of numerous authors to report success in "the psychoanalytic treatment of homosexual patients".

Kenneth Lewes, a gay author, described Homosexuality: Disease or Way of Life? as one of a number of works in which Bergler "provided a whole bestiary of homosexual monstrosities". He characterized Bergler's views as extreme, but nevertheless identified him as "the most important analytic theorist of homosexuality in the 1950s" and maintained that his statements about homosexuals represent the general psychoanalytic consensus at the time Homosexuality: Disease or Way of Life? was written, according to which homosexuals were incapable of "achieving any peace of mind, any satisfying relations with other people, or any genuine artistic accomplishment." He wrote that of all psychoanalysts it was Bergler who waged "the most vigorous campaign against connecting homosexuality with creativity", with Homosexuality: Disease or Way of Life? being a continuation of Bergler's previous efforts. He criticized Bergler for his "insularity and imperviousness to criticism", giving as an example Bergler's insistence on the representativeness of his clinical experience.

According to the historian Dagmar Herzog, no psychoanalyst challenged Bergler's negative generalizations about homosexuals. However, the psychoanalyst Richard Isay, who was also gay, criticized Bergler and other analysts for arguing that legal restrictions on homosexuality are necessary. He described their views as part of a set of outdated anti-gay attitudes. The psychiatrist Richard Pillard compared Bergler's views to those of Socarides, Lawrence Hatterer, and members of the New York Society of Medical Psychoanalysis. Tim Dean and Christopher Lane wrote that with his emphasis on using psychoanalysis as a "cure" for homosexuality, Bergler helped to bring psychoanalytic arguments about homosexuality in the United States into alignment with psychiatric treatment, a development that encouraged "increasingly severe clinical techniques" in the 1950s and 1960s. The psychoanalyst Jack Drescher described Bergler's comments about homosexuals as infamous. The psychiatrist William S. Meyer described Bergler as "the most outspoken, vulgar, and damaging" of those psychoanalysts opposed to homosexuality.

Other evaluations
Homosexuality: Disease or Way of Life? received a mixed review from John F. Oliven in the American Journal of Public Health and the Nation's Health. Oliven described the book as "only moderately well organized" and "heavily padded" with material on various literary figures. He wrote that Bergler engaged in "vigorous polemicizing", and that while Bergler showed "many flashes of brilliance", his opinions had become increasingly dogmatic over time. He noted that many "experienced students of sexual pathology" would disagree with Bergler's denial of the existence of bisexuality as a clinical entity.

Bayer criticized Bergler for his use of aggressive and intemperate language. He wrote that Bergler's comments on homosexuals went beyond the conventional view of homosexuality as a psychiatric disorder. Max Scharnberg described Bergler's characterizations of homosexuals as an example of the absurdity of psychoanalytic propositions. Harry M. Benshoff argued that Bergler's claim that homosexuality had become more widespread through the "creation of new recruits as a result of the dissemination of misleading statistics" expresses the paranoia about homosexuality that was typical of the time, adding that Bergler's writings seem driven by "neurotic hysteria". Jennifer Terry described the book as one of several "xenophobic Cold War texts attacking homosexuality as a morbid psychological condition". She compared it to works by Frank Caprio and Bieber.

See also
 Biology and sexual orientation
 Conversion therapy
 Environment and sexual orientation
 Ex-gay movement
 Homophile movement
 Kinsey Reports

References

Bibliography
Books

 
 
 
 
 
 
 
 
 
 
 
 
 
 

Journals

  
  
  
 
  
  
  
  
 
 
  
  

1956 non-fiction books
American non-fiction books
Books about conversion therapy
Books by Edmund Bergler
English-language books
Farrar, Straus and Giroux books
Psychoanalytic books